A banjo fitting is a hydraulic fitting consisting of a perforated hollow bolt, or internally relieved bolt, and a spherical union for fluid transfer. It is typically used to connect a fluid line to a rigid, internally threaded hydraulic component. The bolt is assembled through the center of the union, usually with face seals on either side of the union, to create a fluid path between the external ports on the union and bolt. A flexible hose or a rigid pipe may be connected to the union port. 

The main advantage of the fitting is in high pressure applications (i.e. more than 50 bar). The name stems from the shape of the fitting, having a large circular section connected to a thinner pipe, generally similar to the shape of a banjo.

Compared to pipe fittings that are themselves threaded, banjo fittings have the advantage that they do not have to be rotated relative to the host fitting. This avoids damage that can be caused by twisting the hose during installation. It also allows the pipe exit direction to be adjusted relative to the fitting, then the bolt tightened independently.

Common applications

Banjo fittings are commonly found in automotive fuel, motor oil and hydraulic systems (e.g.: brakes and clutch). General applications include:

 Hydraulic power systems
 Power steering fluid
 Variable valve timing systems
 Brake caliper connectors
 Turbo charger oil feeds
 Fuel filter connectors
 Carburetor connector
 Hydraulic clutch systems
 Fuel dosing for SCR systems

References

Hydraulics
Threaded fasteners